Keith Mumphery (born June 5, 1992) is an American football wide receiver for the Memphis Showboats of the United States Football League (USFL). He was selected by the Houston Texans in the fifth round of the 2015 NFL Draft. He played college football at Michigan State.

College career
Mumphery committed to play college football at Michigan State University under head coach Mark Dantonio. Throughout his career, he amassed 88 receptions for 1348 yards and 7 touchdowns.

Professional career

Houston Texans
Mumphery was drafted in the fifth round, 175th overall, of the 2015 NFL Draft by the Houston Texans. In his rookie year, he played in 13 games, catching 14 passes for 129 yards. Mumphery also handled punt returns and kickoff returns for the Texans, averaging 7.8 return yards per punt and 24.1 return yards per kickoff.

On June 2, 2017, Mumphery was waived by the Houston Texans because of an allegation of sexual misconduct: the prosecutor would not press charges against Mumphery and he was cleared in the first college investigation, but a second college investigation, conducted by Michigan State University  (MSU) without effectual notification to Mumphrey, found him guilty of sexual misconduct. The alleged incident occurred after Mumphrey had been graduated from MSU, while he was pursuing graduate studies and an NFL career simultaneously. Because of this, Mumphery was banned from the MSU campus until December 31, 2018. In May 2018, Mumphrey filed a lawsuit against Michigan State, which subsequently settled the case and cleared Mumphrey of any wrongdoing.

Dallas Renegades
In 2019, Mumphery was picked by the Dallas Renegades in the 2020 XFL Draft. He was traded to the St. Louis BattleHawks on December 18, 2019. He had his contract terminated when the league suspended operations on April 10, 2020.

Tampa Bay Bandits
On March 10, 2022, Mumphery was drafted by the Tampa Bay Bandits of the United States Football League in the 2022 USFL Supplemental Draft. After suffering a thigh injury, he was transferred to the team's practice squad before the start of the regular season on April 16, 2022. He remained on the inactive roster on April 22. He was transferred to the active roster on May 6.

Memphis Showboats
Mumphery and all other Tampa Bay Bandits players were all transferred to the Memphis Showboats after it was announced that the Bandits were taking a hiatus and that the Showboats were joining the league.

References

1992 births
Living people
American football wide receivers
Michigan State Spartans football players
Dallas Renegades players
Houston Texans players
Players of American football from Georgia (U.S. state)
People from Vienna, Georgia
St. Louis BattleHawks players
Tampa Bay Bandits (2022) players